A Witness Tree is a tree that was present during a grand historical or cultural event of America. The trees got their name from being able to "witness" a historically significant event. Witness trees are centuries old and are known to be of great importance to the U.S. Nation's history. It is unclear how many witness trees there are, but the ones documented are archived in the Library of Congress through the Witness Tree Protection Program.

Witness Tree Protection Program 

Because of their historical importance the Historic American Landscape Survey, under the Heritage Documentation Program, created the Witness Tree Protection Program in 2006. The program was initially created to document and identify two dozen historically significant trees in the Washington DC area. The creation of the program came from the discovery of Yoshino cherry trees from the year 1910. In 1910, the people of Japan had gifted the U.S. Yoshino Cherry Trees as a sign of friendship. The trees gifted in 1910 were all issued to be destroyed after the U.S. Department of Agriculture had determined they had disease and were filled with insects. In the year 1912 Japan had replaced their gift from 1910 with a new set of Yoshino Cherry Trees. USDA records show that two dozen of the trees from 1910 were saved and quarantined for observation by entomologist. The cherry trees are believed to have been planted near Hains Point where you can find a cluster of them that both show signs of being from the early 1900s and that don't match the DNA of the regifted Yoshino Cherry Trees from 1912. The discovery of the 1910 Yoshino Cherry Trees showed the importance of documenting trees that had "witnessed" historically significant events.

List of Witness Trees

The Olmsted Elm 

The Olmsted Elm located on the Frederick Law Olmsted National Historic Site in Brookline, Massachusetts, was planted around the year 1810. The elm was present when Frederick Law Olmsted bought the property in 1883, which he called "Fairsted". Olmsted and his son, John Charles Olmsted, had removed all the other trees left by an Orchard in the vicinity but decided to keep the elm. The elm was kept as an important feature to the pastoral landscape they created and is today an important feature of the historic site.

Jefferson Elm 
333 American Elms were planted North of the Smithsonian Freer Gallery on the National Mall in 1935. Most of the elm have perished and been replaced except for the Jefferson Elm. The Jefferson Elm's leaves remain green through late October, indicating genetically unique specimens. Many experiments were done on the Jefferson Elm from 1980 to the early 1990s. The experiment's results showed resistance to Dutch elm disease, which is believed to have come from a unique genetic arrangement. The elm also has a unique U-shaped branch junction that provides it more stability.

Andrew Jackson Southern Magnolia 

In 1829 President Andrew Jackson planted his late wife's favorite Magnolia trees in memory of her passing. The trees can be found on both sides of the south portico of the White House. These Magnolia trees are the oldest presidentially planted on the White House grounds and they’re also depicted on the U.S. twenty dollar bill.

War of 1812 Willow Oak 

Located in Maryland, the oak sits on the former site of the Mount Welby House. The house that was home to British sympathizers Dr. Samuel Debutts and his family. Today the tree is near the parking lot for the Oxon Cove Park and Oxon Hill Farm in Oxon Hill. The oak witnessed the Battle of Bladensburg on 24 August 1814. The oak is believed to be at least 200 years old, which is past the average life expectancy of a Willow Oak.

The Burnside Sycamore 

One of the most well known Civil war era trees is the Burnside Sycamore located on the Antietam National Battlefield in Maryland. After the battle of Antietam, Alexander Gardner photographed the Burnside Bridge, along with the young sycamore sapling. The tree has faced many casualties and still remains as an important landmark and feature to the site.

The Sickles Oak 
The Sickle Oak is Located in Gettysburg, Pennsylvania, near the Trostle Farm. The oak is known for its use by Daniel Sickles on 2 July 1863 during the Civil War. While in search of a command post, Sickles gathered his men and rested under the shade. The moment was commemorated by Bugler Charles Reed in a sketch.

Oklahoma City Survivor 

The Oklahoma City survivor tree is an American Elm located in downtown Oklahoma City. On 19 April 1995 Timothy McVeigh bombed the Alfred P. Murrah Federal Building. The survivor elm had absorbed some of the blast and had glass and metal embedded into its bark. The elm was initially wanted for evidence but survivors and family members of those killed in the blast had pleaded to save the elm. The elm is now the focal point of the Oklahoma City National Memorial.

George Washington's Mount Vernon Historic Tree 
Located on Mount Vernon in Virginia, the George Washington's Mount Vernon Historic tree is believed to have been planted during the 1780s. The tree was known to have witnessed George Washington’s life, including his return home from presidency. The tree was also carved with corps insignia by Union troops while they were stationed during the Civil War.

Manassas White Oak 
Located in the Manassas National Battle Park in Virginia, along with numerous other witness trees, the Manassas white Oak sits near Stone bridge. The oak was there to witness both the First and Second Battles of Manassas. This oak in particular is well known from a photograph taken by George N. Bernard in March 1862 where the tree is captured with the remains of the bridge and landscape.

Catalpa Trees 
In 1889 the Survey Lodge Ranger Station was completed southwest of the Washington Monument. No trees or shrubs were planted around the station at the time but by 1902 many trees including various Catalpa Trees were present.

White Mulberry Tree 
Established naturally around the year 1910, the While Mulberry Tree is located southwest of the Washington Monument. Evidence of the Mulberry tree dates back from the year 1969. The evidence is a picture from a march against the Vietnam War. The tree is also believed to have also witnessed the March on Washington for Jobs and Freedom.

Circle of Willow Oak Trees 
It is believed that a circle of Willow Oaks were planted in the 1920s south of the Vietnam Women's Memorial. Regardless of when they were planted, they were there to witness the creation of the Constitution Gardens in 1976 and addition of statues to the Vietnam Women's Memorial.

Cork Trees 
Several Amur cork trees that are said to be at least 30 years old are in the area of the Franklin Delano Roosevelt Memorial. It is possible they were there to witness the Thomas Jefferson Memorial construction and its dedication in 1943.

Yoshino Cherry Trees 
A row of Cherry Trees along the Tidal Basin in Washington DC were originally a gift from Japan as a symbol of friendship in 1910. The cherry trees given were infected with bugs and diseases and so Japan replaced their gift with a new set of Cherry Trees in 1912. Two Yoshino cherry trees were planted on the Northern Bank of the tidal basin by Helen Herron Taft and the Viscountess Chinda, wife of the Japanese Ambassador, on 27 March 1912. This ceremony started Washington DC's renowned National Cherry Blossom Festival.

References 

Trees of the United States